Sibs Shongwe- La Mer (born 11 September 1991) is a screenwriter, film director, musician, TED (conference) talks alumni and visual artist born in Johannesburg, South Africa. His critically acclaimed debut feature film, Necktie Youth premiered in the Panorama section of the 65th Berlin International Film Festival, Tribeca Film Festival, Sydney Film Festival and numerous top tier international film festivals, winning "Best South African Feature Film" and "Best Direction" at the Durban International Film Festival in 2015. The film went on to garner a multitude of awards including "Best Achievement in Cinematography" and "Best Achievement in editing" at the 2015 South African Film and Television Awards. Necktie Youth was theatrically released in South Africa (2015) at Ster-Kinekor and on the iTunes Store & DStv Box-office. The film was later released in the Netherlands, Brazil & American VOD between 2016–2017.  Mid 2016, Shongwe-La Mer signed representation contracts with top London film lit agency Casarotto Ramsey & Associates  ,  Rick Yorn's legendary LBI entertainment & Hollywood heavy weight CAA.

In 2016, Shongwe-La Mer made the selection for the Berlinale Talents program of the prestigious Berlinale.  2017 brought the young director back to the festival for a third consecutive year of participance with a feature film in development selected for the "Berlinale Directors" category of the Co-Production Market (European Film Market ) with the screenplay for South African drama "The Color Of The Skull". The project was presented to top industry professionals as an alumni project. On numerous occasions the South African director has expressed a respect for the A-list festival.

Later that year Shongwe-La Mer had a third feature project selected for the Paris Co-Production Village at the 2017 Champs-Élysées Film Festival where he presented a third feature screenplay for project "The Sound Of Animals Fighting". That October, Variety (magazine) reported the feature will star Hollywood heartthrob Emile Hirsch and X-Men star Alice Braga shooting in Brazil and Johannesburg.

In 2018 Shongwe-La Mer participated in the prestigious Cannes Film Festival where he took his screenplay "Color Of The Skull" to l´Atelier de la Cinéfondation. Shongwe-La Mer took the top prize winning Le Prix ARTE International for most promising cinematic vision.

Early career

Sibs Shongwe-La Mer (born Sibusiso Mandla Shongwe) was born in Sandton in the Northern Suburbs of Johannesburg, South Africa on 11 September 1991. His visual art and cinema career began in his late teens after the untimely death of a high school girlfriend and other influential tragedies befell his social circle and resulted in the creation of various bodies of art and film exploring themes of suburbia malaise, depression and the new South African experience. First working as an independent music video director and rock n roll photographer for local acts, Shongwe-La Mer had his first notable international film festival exposure with self funded low-fi production "Territorial Pissings" that was screened as a work-in-progresses at the 70th Venice International Film Festival (La Biennale di Venezia) in 2013 with a copy of the work added to the festivals historical archives. At this time, Shongwe-La Mer was additional active as a visual artist & photographer, exhibiting works in his country of birth as well as various galleries around the world.

International Grants & Residencies

Film

Amsterdams Fonds voor de Kunst (Netherlands)- 3 Package Deal Recipient (2017-2018) 

This tttsuccessful programme from the AFK and Bureau Broedplaatsen (BBp) in association with 35 renowned Amsterdam arts institutions is now considered an example of best practices in the field of talent development.  The aim of the 3Package Deal is to encourage and assist exceptional global talent from various disciplines who are awarded working space and a development budget (€22,500). Moreover, each artistic discipline allows coalitions, which now fifty renowned Amsterdam (Art) participating institutions. These institutions take a long year the selection and supervision of the promising artists themselves and their network, knowledge and stages open to them.

Sibs Shongwe-La Mer was selected as one of two global filmmakers as part of the Film Coalition made up of EYEEYE Film Institute Netherlands, the Netherlands Film Academy, the Binger Filmlab and IDFA (film festival). Halal, the Amsterdam producer, has also entered into a creative alliance with this talented young filmmaker. In the coming year, Sibs Shongwe-La Mer plans to develop a second full-length film in collaboration with this producer, and with the support of the Film Coalition. In addition, he will try to promote a closer cooperation between young Dutch and South African filmmakers.

Berlinale (Germany)-  Berlinale Talents (2016) 

Berlinale Talent Campus is the annual summit and networking platform of the Berlin International Film Festival for 250 outstanding creatives from the fields of film and drama series.
Berlinale Talents is an initiative of the Berlin International Film Festival, a business division of the Kulturveranstaltungen des Bundes in Berlin GmbH, funded by the Federal Government Commissioner for Culture and the Media, in cooperation with Creative Europe MEDIA, a programme of the European Union, the Robert Bosch Stiftung and Medienboard Berlin-Brandenburg. It was initiated in 2003. In addition to the extensive summit programme of master classes and panel discussions with top-notch experts, Berlinale Talents offers a range of Project Labs in which you can further develop and present your own project. Berlinale Talents also provides Studio programmes and workshops for specific groups of film professionals. As an initiative of the Berlin International Film Festival, the entire event is closely linked with the programmes of the festival sections and the European Film Market.
Shongwe-La Mer was selected for the 2016 edition of talents although could not be in attendance.

Festival Del Film Locarno (Switzerland)-  Filmmakers Academy (2015) 

Founded in 2010 with the aim of helping develop the abilities of emerging talents, the Locarno Academy is a Locarno Festival training project for young directors, professionals, students and film critics. The Academy was born from a desire to build on Locarno's attributes as a site of productive encounters, exchange of views and reflection on film, taking full advantage of the Festival's infrastructure and its numerous guests. A hundred promising young talents from all over the world are selected and invited to participate in one of the Locarno Summer Academy's five initiatives: Filmmakers Academy, Critics Academy, Industry Academy, Documentary Summer School and Cinema&Gioventù. The program offers a range of training options, spanning from general film education, training in film criticism for young journalists, to workshops for the upcoming generation of industry professionals and emerging directors working on their first film.

Visual Arts

Prince Claus Fund (Netherlands) (2015) 

The Prince Claus Fund was established in 1996, named in honor of Prince Claus of the Netherlands. It receives an annual subsidy from the Dutch Ministry of Foreign Affairs.
The Fund has presented the international Prince Claus Awards annually since 1997 to honor individuals and organizations reflecting a progressive and contemporary approach to the themes of culture and development. Recipients are mainly located in Africa, Asia, Latin America, and the Caribbean.

Filmography

As writer/director
Necktie Youth  (2015) (Urucu media/Halal Films)
Territorial Pissings (2013) (Whitman Pictures Independent)
Death Of Tropics (2012) (Whitman Pictures Independent)
 The Sound Of Animals Fighting (In Development) (2018) (Fireworx Media)
 Color Of The Skull (In Development) (2018) (Mille Et Une Paris/Halal Film/Whitman Pictures Independent)

As actor

Necktie Youth  (Supporting Lead- "September") (2015) (SA)
 "The Cubs Won (And I Died) (Supporting role- "Brice") (2017) (US)

As Producer/Executive Producer

Territorial Pissings (2013)
Death Of Tropics (2012)

Awards/Nominations

References 

1991 births
Living people
South African screenwriters
South African film directors
South African musicians
People from Johannesburg